Calomyscus elburzensis, also known as Goodwin's calomyscus or Goodwin's brush-tailed mouse is a species of mouse-like hamster. It is found in northeastern and northern Iran, western Afghanistan, and southern Turkmenistan, where it is found in rocky areas in mountains.

References

 

Mouse-like hamsters
Mammals described in 1938